Mount Con Reid is a mountain on Vancouver Island, British Columbia, Canada, located  east of Gold River and  northeast of El Piveto Mountain in Nootka Land District.

See also
List of mountains in Canada

References

Vancouver Island Ranges
One-thousanders of British Columbia
Nootka Land District